Tom de Graaff (born 10 December 2004) is a Dutch footballer who plays for Jong Ajax as a goalkeeper.

Career
De Graaff joined the Ajax academy in 2015. In September, 2021 de Graaf signed a contract with Ajax to take him into the summer of 2024 with the club. In July, 2022 he was included in the Ajax first team’s pre-season training camp to Austria. De Graaff made his debut for Jong Ajax in the Eerste Divisie on 22 August 2022 at home against De Graafschap.

International career
In September 2022 De Graaff was called up to the Dutch U19 squad for matches against Slovenia, Northern Ireland, and Moldova.

References

External links
 

Living people
2004 births
Dutch footballers
Jong Ajax players
Eerste Divisie players